Chlamydomonas elegans is a species of freshwater green algae.

References

External links
 Chlamydomonas elegans at AlgaeBase

Chlamydomonadaceae
Plants described in 1915